Mark Alexander Birrell  (born 7 February 1958) is a company director and a former Cabinet Minister in the Australian state of Victoria.

Early life
Birrell was born in Melbourne and was educated at Trinity Grammar. He studied at Monash University obtaining a Bachelor of Economics and a Bachelor of Laws. While studying, Birrell worked for Senator Alan Missen and also served terms as president of the Victorian and federal Young Liberals. He was admitted to practice as a barrister and solicitor in 1983.

Politics
When long serving MP William Campbell resigned his safe Legislative Council seat of East Yarra Province in 1983, Birrell won Liberal preselection and succeeded him as its member. Two years later he entered the shadow Cabinet as shadow Health Minister.

Birrell became the Leader of the Liberal Party in the legislative council from 1988 and in 1992 he became the Government Leader of the Upper House, a position he would hold through to 1999. During this period he served as Minister for Conservation and Environment, creating the Yarra Ranges National Park, pioneering laws for coastal protection in the State, overseeing Albert Park's revitalisation, and handling key stakeholder issues.

During the first term of the Kennett government he also served as the Minister for Major Projects. He was responsible for the 'Agenda 21' infrastructure projects like the new Melbourne Convention & Exhibition Centre, Melbourne Museum, City Circle tram, the Regent Theatre, Docklands, Beacon Cove and the Melbourne Sports & Aquatic Centre. After the 1996 election he swapped his Ministerial portfolios for the Industry, Science and Technology portfolio. As minister he oversaw the State's first "Science, Engineering and Technology policy," legislating for 7-day shop trading, and overseeing a successful investment attraction program.

After the defeat of the Kennett Government at the 1999 election, Birrell continued as Liberal Upper House leader and served as shadow Minister for Industry, Science and Technology.  Widespread media commentary called for him to switch to the lower house and take the Leadership of the Victorian Liberal Party as his predecessor Sir Rupert Hamer had done. However, Birrell decided to leave Parliament and return to private enterprise after the 2002 election.

In private enterprise
Birrell is currently the independent chairman of Australia Post Super Scheme (APSS), a fund with over $8 billion of assets and 30,000 members. He is an independent non-executive director of Transurban. He is also the past president of the Victorian Chamber of Commerce and Industry.

Birrell was chairman of the Port of Melbourne Corporation until November 2016. The Andrews Government embarked on a “privatisation drive”  in its first term, with Birrell overseeing the sale of the Port of Melbourne for $9.7 billion. Birrell reflects on this as “….an example of a Labor government wanting to recycle capital from one large asset into other assets. And it was a very good example of public policy working, regardless of the political party in power.” The proceeds of the sale were injected back into Victorian infrastructure projects, including the Level Crossing Removal Project.

Birrell was the founding chairman of Infrastructure Partnerships Australia, the nation's peak infrastructure advocacy body. He served as the independent non-executive chairman of the Australian Payments Council, the strategic coordination body for the Australian payments industry.  He was also on the board of Australia Post, serving as deputy chairman and non-executive director.

He is a Fellow of the Australian Institute of Company Directors.

Birrell is a former National Leader of the Infrastructure Group and special counsel at Minter Ellison. He had previously held positions as a trustee of both the Melbourne Cricket Ground (1992–96) and the Melbourne and Olympic Parks Trust (1995–99).

Honours
Birrell was appointed a Member of the Order of Australia in the 2021 Queen's Birthday Honours.

References

1958 births
Politicians from Melbourne
Liberal Party of Australia members of the Parliament of Victoria
Members of the Order of Australia
Members of the Victorian Legislative Council
Victorian Ministers for the Environment
Living people
People educated at Trinity Grammar School, Kew
Monash Law School alumni
21st-century Australian politicians